Heterocheila hannai is a species of fly in the family Heterocheilidae.

References

Sciomyzoidea
Articles created by Qbugbot
Insects described in 1921